The Verbandsliga Saarland is currently the seventh tier of the German football league system in the German federated state of Saarland. Until the introduction of the Saarlandliga in 2009 it was the sixth tier, until the introduction of the 3. Liga in 2008 it was the fifth tier of the league system, until the introduction of the Regionalligas in 1994 the fourth tier.

From the 2012-13 season onwards the league will be played in two regional divisions and the Landesligas below it increased in numbers from two to four.

Overview
The Verbandsliga was formed in 1947 under the name of Ehrenliga Saarland in the state of Saarland. The league was originally a feeder league to the Oberliga Südwest. Due to the special situation of Saarland, its clubs left the German football league system from 1949 to 1951 with the 1. FC Saarbrücken playing a year in the French second division. From its return in 1951, now under the name of Amateurliga Saarland, until the establishment of the Oberliga Südwest in 1978, it was the third tier of the football league system.

The league was established in 1947 with ten teams, the winner gaining promotion to the Oberliga Südwest. The founder members were:

FC 08 Homburg
Sportfreunde Burbach
FC Ensdorf
SC Brebach
Preußen Merchweiler
FV Püttlingen
SV Ludweiler
ASC Dudweiler
SV Bliekastel
Hellas Marpingen
Viktoria Hühnerfeld

With the return to the German league system in 1951, two teams from the league, now called Amateurliga Saarland were admitted to the Oberliga Südwest, the 1. FC Saarbrücken and Borussia Neunkirchen.

The year after, three clubs were admitted to the new 2nd Oberliga Südwest, the Viktoria Hühnerfeld, SC Altenkessel und Sportfreunde Saarbrücken. 

The winner of the Amateurliga Saarland was not automatically promoted to its superior league but rather had to take part in a promotion play-off. The champion would have to compete with the winners of the Amateurligen Südwest and Rheinland.

With the introduction of the Bundesliga in 1963 the Amateurliga was placed below the new Regionalliga Südwest but still retained its third-tier status. It continued to do so after the introduction of the 2nd Bundesliga Süd in 1974.

In 1978, the same time as the Oberliga Südwest, the Amateurliga Saarland was renamed Verbandsliga Saarland and was now the fourth tier of the league system. The top seven teams out of the Amateurliga went to the new Oberliga while the teams from place 8 to 19 found themselves in the Verbandsliga.

The winner of the Verbandsliga Saarland, like the winners of the Verbandsligen Südwest and Rheinland gains direct promotion to the Oberliga Südwest. The runners-up will only get a chance for promotion when there are additional spots to fill in the Oberliga, like 1994 when the Regionalligen were introduced and VfB Dillingen was promoted.

The Saarland was the youngest of the states of West Germany, until 1957 it was a separate entity under French supervision. Its football league was temporarily separate, too. The clubs from the Saar did not play in the German football league system from 1948 to 1951.

Feeder Leagues to the Verbandsliga Saarland
Landesliga Saarland-Nord
Landesliga Saarland-Ost
Landesliga Saarland-Süd
Landesliga Saarland-West

In May 2008, the Saarland Football Association decided to change the league system by introducing the new Saarlandliga as the sixth tier, between Oberliga and Verbandsliga, from 2009. For the Verbandsliga, this meant, it would lose almost all its clubs to the new league and be relegated to seventh tier. Otherwise, it remained unchanged.

League winners
The league champions in the single division era:

The league champions in the two division era:

bold denotes club gained promotion.
VfB Dillingen (1994), Rot–Weiß Hasborn (1999), 1. FC Saarbrücken II (2002), TuS Steinbach (2015), FSG Bous (2017), SF Rehlingen (2018) and 1. FC Reimsbach (2019) were also promoted, finishing runners–up.
FC Kutzhof withdrew from the league in 2006; no team from Saarland was promoted that year. The club's main sponsor withdrew its support and the team could not be financed to play in the Oberliga. Kutzhof withdrew on 10 July 2006. Had the withdrawal been done before 30 June, the runners–up of the league could have been promoted instead.

References

Sources
 Deutschlands Fußball in Zahlen,  An annual publication with tables and results from the Bundesliga to Verbandsliga/Landesliga. DSFS
 Kicker Almanach,  The yearbook on German football from Bundesliga to Oberliga, since 1937. Kicker Sports Magazine.
 Süddeutschlands Fussballgeschichte in Tabellenform 1897-1988  History of Southern German football in tables, by Ludolf Hyll
 Die Deutsche Liga-Chronik 1945-2005  History of German football from 1945 to 2005 in tables. DSFS. 2006.

External links 
 Das deutsche Fussball Archiv  Historic German league tables
 Saarland Football Association website  
 Verbandsliga Saarland at Fussball.de  

Saa
Football competitions in Saarland
1947 establishments in Germany
Sports leagues established in 1947